North Branch Mahantango Creek is a tributary of Mahantango Creek in Snyder County, Pennsylvania, in the United States.

The ratio of nitrogen to phosphorus in North Branch Mahantango Creek is 18 to 1. The main rock types in the watershed are shale, interbedded sedimentary rock, carbonate rock, and sandstone. The creek's watershed has an area of approximately 37 square miles.

Course
North Branch Mahantango Creek begins in West Perry Township, Snyder County, on Shade Mountain in Bald Eagle State Forest. It flows south-southeast off Shade Mountain and then turns east and flows in Heister Valley between Chestnut Ridge and Lime Ridge. It receives a number of small and unnamed tributaries from the north and after several miles exits West Perry Township. Upon leaving West Perry Township, the creek enters Perry Township and continues flowing east for a short distance. It then reaches the community of Mount Pleasant Mills and turns southeast. The creek crosses Pennsylvania Route 35 and begins paralleling Pennsylvania Route 104,  turning south shortly thereafter. It passes Potato Valley, where an unnamed tributary enters it from the west and then passes Buckwheat Valley (where another unnamed tributary enters it from the west) and the community of Shadle. It continues south, passing the Long Woods and receiving a tributary from Trout Valley. The creek then reaches Aline Creek and the community of Aline. A short distance downstream, it reaches the border between Perry Township and Chapman Township. The creek then flows along the border for a few miles, running parallel to Pennsylvania State Game Lands #194. It then reaches its confluence with Mahantango Creek.

Tributaries
Tributaries of North Branch Mahantango Creek include Aline Creek and a number of unnamed tributaries. Several tributaries are considered impaired according to the Pennsylvania Department of Environmental Protection.

Chemical hydrology
A five square mile area of the watershed of North Branch Mahantango Creek is considered by the Pennsylvania Department of Environmental Protection to be impaired.

The ratio of nitrogen to phosphorus in North Branch Mahantango Creek is 18 to 1, making phosphorus a limiting nutrient. There is no point source pollution in the impaired part of the watershed.

Geology, geography, and climate
In the impaired section of the watershed of North Branch Mahantango Creek, 38% of the surface rock is sandstone, 25% is carbonate, 24% is shale, and 12% is interbedded sedimentary rock. In an unimpaired portion of the watershed, 50% of the surface rock is sandstone, 34% is interbedded sedimentary rock, 10% is shale, and 6% is carbonate.

Sandstone lies under the northern part of the North Branch Mahantango Creek watershed's impaired section. South of the sandstone is shale. In the southern part of this section of the watershed, there is interbedded sedimentary rock and carbonate rock. A nearby unimpaired part of the watershed has a similar arrangement of rock.

The Mahantango Formation can be found in the watershed of North Branch Mahantango Creek and is named for the creek.

Most of the North Branch Mahantango Creek watershed is mountainous, with spurs and ridges. Its channel is sinuous and runs through rock formations consisting of limestone, sandstone, and shale.

North Branch Mahantango Creek is a limestone stream.

The wettest month is June, when  of precipitation falls. The driest month is February, when  falls. Streamflow occurs more in March than in any other month.

Watershed
The watershed of North Branch Mahantango Creek has an area of approximately 37 square miles. According to the Susquehanna River Basin Commission, the creek's watershed is one of the highest-quality watersheds in the lower Susquehanna River watershed.

The most common land use in the impaired part of the watershed of North Branch Mahantango Creek is deciduous forest, which makes up 55.5% of the area. Cropland makes up 21.1% of this part of the watershed and hay and pastures make up 17.3% of it. 3.7% is mixed forest, and 2.5% is coniferous forest. 0.5% of the land (a quarry) is considered "high-intensity development" by the Pennsylvania Department of Environmental Protection. 0.2% of the land is considered "low-intensity development" by the Pennsylvania Department of Environmental Protection. An unimpaired portion of the creek's watershed includes of 58.5% deciduous forest, 21.1% cropland, 11.9% hay and pasture, 4.2% coniferous forest, and 3.2% mixed forest. The remaining 0.7% of this part of the watershed's area consists of 0.5% "low-intensity development" and 0.2% "high-intensity development".

Nearly all of the northern part of the impaired portion of the watershed of North Branch Mahantango Creek is forested and most of the southern part is agricultural or developed. A nearby unimpaired part of the creek's watershed has the same layout. Both parts of the watershed have wetlands.

History
In the early 1920s, agriculture was the main industry in the watershed of West Branch Mahantango Creek. The creek also powered several small gristmills at this time.

The Aline Covered Bridge was built over North Branch Mahantango Creek in 1884.

Mahantango Creek's name comes from the Delaware word mahantongo, meaning "where we had plenty to eat".

Biology
North Branch Mahantango Creek is stocked with trout. Moderate numbers of brown trout and some young of the year inhabit it. Herds of livestock can freely access the creek. It lacks a protected riparian buffer.

In his book Trout Unlimited's Guide to Pennsylvania Limestone Streams, A. Joseph Armstrong said that North Branch Mahantango Creek "doesn't rival the Little Lehigh or Fishing Creek, but it is an honest-to-goodness limestone stream" and that it "is not an important stream, but in this relatively barren part of the Commonwealth it is worth keeping in mind if you can't fish elsewhere."

See also
West Branch Mahantango Creek, the other tributary of Mahantango Creek
List of rivers of Pennsylvania

References

Rivers of Snyder County, Pennsylvania
Rivers of Pennsylvania
Tributaries of the Susquehanna River